Sixpenny Handley  or Handley is a village and former civil parish, now in the parish of Sixpenny Handley and Pentridge, in north east Dorset, England, situated on Cranborne Chase ten miles (16 km) north east of Blandford Forum. In the 2011 census the parish had a population of 1,233. The civil parish was abolished on 1 April 2015 and merged with Pentridge to form Sixpenny Handley and Pentridge.

Toponymy
The village was originally known as Handley, or Handley St Mary. The use of the name Sixpenny Handley to describe the village and parish is fairly modern, and was being used as an alternative name by the middle of the 19th century.

Handley is derived from the Old English hēan "high" and lēage "clearing". Sixpenny was added to distinguish the place from other Handleys, and refers to Sixpenny Handley Hundred, first mentioned in the 14th century as the hundred of "Sexpenne et Henle". The hundred took its name from this Handley and a place called Sixpenny, now a farm, in the south west of the parish of Fontmell Magna.  Sixpenny was first recorded in 932 as Seaxpenn, and means "hill of the Saxons" (from Old English Seaxe and Brythonic penn).  The reference is to the hill now known as Pen Hill east of the modern farm, and probably marks an ancient boundary.

History
On Woodcutts Common in the north of the parish (west-northwest of the village) is the site of a 4-acre Iron Age and Romano-British settlement, probably a farm. It was excavated by General Pitt Rivers in 1884–5.

The Great Fire of Handley 1892
On 20 May 1892, the village suffered a major fire which resulted in most of it having to be rebuilt, after nearly two hundred people were left homeless. Well-wishers subsequently sent gifts to aid the villagers; so much clothing was donated that it was said a man could be identified as being from Handley because he wore two or even three waistcoats. This generosity was celebrated in 2014 by the Heritage Lottery–supported Sixpenny Handley Waistcoat Festival.

Geography
The parish covers three valleys—the village being in the easternmost—which all drain south.

Cranborne Chase is a designated Area of Outstanding Natural Beauty. Other protected areas nearby include Garston Wood, a hazel coppice and RSPB reserve,. and Martin Down, an area of chalk downland and a national nature reserve.

Demography 
In the 2011 census Sixpenny Handley parish—which includes the settlements of Gussage St Andrew, Woodcutts and Deanland—had 554 dwellings, 532 households and a population of 1,233.

The historic population of Sixpenny Handley parish from the censuses between 1921 and 2001 is shown in the table below.

Dorset County Council's 2013 mid-year estimate of the population of Sixpenny Handley parish is 1,210.

Governance
Sixpenny Handley falls within the electoral ward called 'Handley Vale'. The ward's most northerly parish is Pentridge, it then goes south as far as Witchampton. The total population of the ward at the 2011 Census was 2,491.
Handley Vale is in the North Dorset Parliamentary Constituency.

Economy
Business units are provided at Town Farm Workshops and also at Manor Farm just outside the village. The village has a NISA convenience store and a butchers shop. There is a workshop garage which has no fuel pumps. There is a restaurant, two cafés, a pub which closed in 2019 and brewery.

Tourism
Sixpenny Handley is located on the B3081 road which has been described as providing "a magical driving experience", and the village is a popular stop-over for touring. Cranborne Chase hosts a number of festivals including The Great Dorset Steam Fair, Larmer Tree Festival and the Cranborne Chase AONB Woodfair; the village is always busy at these times. The village's isolated position makes it popular with both walkers and star gazers.

Religion
The parish church of St Mary dates from the 14th century. It has been designated a Grade II* listed building.
St Marys is a Church of England Church. It is in the parish of St Mary's, Sixpenny Handley, Gussage St Andrew and St Rumbold's, Pentridge.
The Church yard is managed according to the Living Churchyards project.

Sport and recreation
The village recreation field area includes a car park, sports pavilion, cricket pitch, football field, tennis court, bowling green, skate park, play park and the village hall.

There is a play park for toddlers in Keats Meadow.

The village has two allotment sites; both are managed by the village's allotment committee.

Facilities
Handley has a doctor's surgery and a telephone exchange which supplies broadband internet connection. Handley is visited by the local library van and is on local bus routes. Handley is not on mains gas.

Clubs and societies
Sixpenny Handley has several clubs and societies including Women's Institute, Mother's Union, bowls, tennis, football, cricket, cards, and Scouts.

Education
Handley has a first school which takes children for reception and years one to four.  Children generally feed into Cranborne Middle School and then Queen Elizabeth's School in Wimborne Minster.

Community
The community magazine is "The Downsman".  The magazine includes news, articles it is supported by advertising and the Parish Council. The church magazine "The Seeker" is a four-page insert in The Downsman.

Most years see Handley host some sort of street party.  For 2014 the Sixpenny Handley Waistcoat Festival Committee has secured Heritage Lottery funding for an event remembering the Great Fire of Handley 1892 and the generosity of well-wishers, without whom the people of Handley would have suffered great hardships.

The village's annual fireworks display is held close to Guy Fawkes Night at Church Farm Campsite. The event is run by First Woodcutts Scouts.

See also
Sixpenny Handley (hundred)

References

External links

Village website
Village Street Fair website

Villages in Dorset
Former civil parishes in Dorset
East Dorset District
Populated places disestablished in 2015